Letjen Haji Sudirman Stadium is a multi-use stadium in Bojonegoro, Indonesia.  It is currently used mostly for football matches and is used as the home venue for Persibo Bojonegoro of the Liga Indonesia. The stadium has a capacity of 15,000 spectators.

References

External links
Stadium information

Football venues in Indonesia
Buildings and structures in East Java